Bhai Lakhishah Banjara (4 July 1580  7 June 1680) was a warrior and Banjara king, Asian trader, civil contractor and the owner of four villages located in Delhi. He was also supplying goods for the Mughal Army.

He died on 7 June 1680 at Malcha Palace at the age of 99 years and 10 months. He had eight sons, seventeen grandsons and twenty-four great-grandsons. He is also created World largest 'Lohgarh' fort. He also played an important role in Sikh history and he also man also has the power to fight against Mughal emperor Aurangzeb. Lakhisha was great humanitarian king of Banjara. It's published by preetham bu shikarpura

Biography  
 

King Lakhi Rai Banjara was a rich Asian trader from Delhi. He was the owner of four villages in Delhi named Malcha, Raisina, Baharkamba and Narela. He belonged to a Banjara family. He was supplying saddles, limestone, bridles, Stirrup, and reins for the Mughal Army. Lakhi also used to trade cotton, lime powder, and calcium hydroxide. He had four Tandas, each with 50,000 bulk carts, and 3,00000 armed forces for the protection and management of tanda. He used to import and export goods from Central Asia to India. His grandfather Nayak Thakur was one of the main suppliers of the Mughal Army during the reign of Akbar. He was the main contractor for the construction of Red Fort, Delhi. He employed more than 400,000 people.
King Lakhishah Banjara was indulged in inter-regional exchanges in agriculture products, construction materials, and livestock. A former administrative unit of the Indian subcontinent Pargana, Sehwān, Sindh, and the Bhotiyas of central Himalayas traded with Bhai Lakhi Banjara by exchanging camels, horses, oxen, sheep, goats, elephants in lieu of exchanging food grains and weapons following the barter system. Tanda of the Banjara carried all their household along with them, consisted of many families in one tanda. Their purpose of life was somewhat like carriers, they were continuously moving from one place to another for trading purposes. 

The name LakhiShah is the title of 'Shah', 'Rai'. It means King. Lakhishah Banjara was not only an Asian great trader but also a generous humanitarian king.
King Lakhi Banjara  convoy carried between one ton to ten tons of load. Despite the slow speed, the amount of inexpensive goods moved was essentially considerable to the mass market. His tanda comprised 4 lakh people and each family had a hundred oxen to carry the goods. The total number of oxen was about 9 million (assuming the conventional ratio of 4 to 5 members per family). Each group of oxen carried loads for about one-third of the year with 15km per day journey. The massive trading of Banjara made him one of the richest traders of the country. He constructed wells and ponds after every 10 kilometers on the trade route so that livestock and their companions could easily get water. The archaeological evidence of ponds and wells constructed by Bhai Lakhi are still found in many parts of the country. 

He also constructed several Sarais (caravanserai)  for the purpose of night halt. Such unified operations enabled him to conduct the trade more comfortably. He was also known named as 'Shah' that means King.

Legacy and memorials

Relationship with Guru Nanak 
In order to fight the oppression against Mughals, his family was associated with Guru Nanak and Baba Banda Singh Bahadur. Bhai Banjara and his brother Bhai Gurdas were close associates of Guru Hargobind, Guru Har Rai, Guru Har Krishan, Guru Tegh Bahadur, and Baba Gurditta. After his death, his sons Bhai Hema, Bhai Naghaiya (latter became Jawahar Singh), Bhai Haria and his daughter Bibi Seeto, (later became Basant Kaur) were close associates of Guru Gobind Singh Sahib, the tenth Sikh Guru. From 1700 to 1704, Bhai Hema, Bhai Naghaiya and Bhai Haria were martyred at Anandpur fighting against Mughals.

Later, his grandsons Bhai Agraj Singh and Bhai Faraj Singh, who were among the main generals of Baba Banda Singh Bahadur were also killed during the battles of Lohgarh and Sadhaura. Both of them were killed on 09 June 1716, along with Baba Banda Singh Bahadur at Delhi. He dedicated almost 80 years of his life to flourishing Sikhism and sacrificed his wealth and family members for the sake of Sikhism.

Notable memorials 
Lohagarh Fort, established by Baba Banda Singh Bahadur, is spread on almost 7000 acres land. It is situated in the old state of Nahan, now in district Yamuna Nagar of Haryana and district Sirmour of Himanchal Pradesh. The fort Lohgarh is in the revenue estates of Lohgarh (HP), Haripur (HP), Jhil (HP), Mehtawali (HP), Palori (HP), Sukron (HP), Maharonwala (HP), Bhagwanpur Nathauri (Haryana), Dhanaura (Haryana), Nagli (Haryana) and Mohindinpur (Haryana). The circumference of the fort is about 30  km. Archaeological evidence and engineering formulas (time and motion study) depicts that it took almost 70 to 80 years for making fortifications in such a huge area. (This research has been conducted by the Lohgarh Trust of Yamunanagar)

The presence of these archaeological structures related to King Bhai LakhiShah Banjara near Lohgarh Fort indicates that Bhai LakhiShah Banjara contributed to the construction of Lohgarh Fort around 1630 to 1675. Bhai LakhiShah Banjara was a rich Asian trader who had good relationships with Mughals, as he used to pay heavy taxes. His movement in the vicinity of Lohgarh, never came under the suspicious radar of Mughals and he continued to supply construction material, arms, horses and food items to the men, indulged in the construction of the Fort Lohgarh. He inhabited more than 80 villages having a Sikh population in the vicinity of Lohgarh, which was later destroyed by the Mughal.

King Banjara was a strategist and a warrior. King LakhiShah Banjara was one of the biggest and historic role in the construction of Lohgarh Fort. He established many cottage industries in the pargana of Khizrabad situated on the Dabar hills. This area was an undulated land with a thorny jungle. In the 17th and 18th centuries, the area around Lohgarh was unproductive and had no income because there was no agricultural activity in the area. Hence, Mughal's military unit Mansabdars had no interest in the said land. 

The sparse population and rough terrain in the vicinity of Lohgarh allowed Sikhs and Banjara to live near Lohgarh to accomplish the divine and secret mission of constructing the fort Lohgarh.

In order to create employment opportunities, cottage industries pertaining to various tasks were established. Weapon industry was established in the revenue estate of village Vansantoor and Sikh Tandas brought iron ore and copper ore from Bihar mines. Fire clay toy factory was established in the revenue estate of village Sandhya. A number of brick kilns were created by the Sikhs to produce the construction material for the Lohgarh fort and its ancillary forts. The quarries of limestone were brought in an abundant quantity in the Shivalik Hills. The other raw material such as stone was also comfortably available near the point of construction of the fort. Steady, it became an important trading center, education center and army training center for the Sikhs. Well developed market of timber in the pargana of Khizrabad, helped in the flourishing of the Sikh trade movement. From Khizrabad, the goods were easily transported through the waterways like boat transport system and also by bullock carts.

Several other forts were also constructed by the Sikhs under the guidance of Bhai Lakhi Shah Banjara in the 17th century, near the Kotwali of Buria. Garhi Banjara, Dayalgarh and Sugh are the places where the forts of the Banjara Sikhs were exist. These places are situated on the bank of Yamuna river. These forts were later destroyed by the Mughals after 1716, but there is still sufficient archeological evidence on the site. The revenue records of 1852, also reflect the existence of forts in the said area.

Persian sources (Ahkam-I-Alamgir 1703–1707, translated by Irfan Habib) described that 
In this while, Muhammad Auliya, resident of the township of Buria, in parana Khizrabad, sarkar Sahrind [Sirhind], has reported through persons known to this just world- adorning Court that his Highness [the addressee] had, in accordance with imperial orders, and in concert with the qazi, (Nanak-parastan) in the said township, and built a mosque, installing a dervish Saivid Muzaffar by name, for the offering of Muslim prayers in that mosque. The said people i.e. 'the Nanak investigation, they have admitted having killed him. But, owing to the representation made by some of them who have come to this benevolent Court, the qazi and muhtasib of that place have been dismissed without any fault of theirs; and 'Alimullah has been appointed qazi and his father the muhtasib [lit. given (the charge of) ihtisab]. The world-binding order has been issued that his Highness may be written to, as to why such negligence has occurred. Amends should be made in a commendable manner. "It belongs to Him, and is on God's account." It was also ordered that he should write the true facts about the previous qazi and muhtasib, and, till the receipt of his reply, the orders of appointment of the proposed qazi and muhtasib be not issued.

King  LakhiShah Banjara and his descendants played a significant role in the construction of Lohgarh and helped Sikhs prepare to fight the oppression of the Mugals.

There was a considerable amount of population of Banjara Sikhs in the pargana of Khizrabad, and after 1716 they were gradually killed during the Mughals regime. Some Sikh populations were forcibly converted to Islam, and the population moved to Pakistan after Partition of India occurred in 1947.

Works

Relations with Guru Granth 
Sikh Guru and Bhagati movement saints have given great importance to Tandas, Banjara and Naiks tribes in central religious scripture of Sikhism Guru Granth Sahib. Banjara culture had used to explain the Gurmat and to achieve the salvation of the true Lord. It indicates that the Banjaras were very close to Sikh Gurus and the Bhagati movements saints.

Bhagat Kabir Sahib narrates:

Bhagat Ravi Das jio also used nomenclature of Banjaras and Tandas to achieve the salvation of God.

Guru Nanak Sahib introduces Banjaras about the true lord and call Banjaras as friend

Guru Amar das Sahib, Guru Ram das Sahib and Guru Arjun Sahib have given the reference of banjaras in various stanzas of Guru Granth Sahib.

Unrecognized contribution 
Bhai Lakhisha Banjara is regarded as a hero in Sikh history, although historians have failed to justify his contributions and sacrifices to Sikhism. He is well known for his notable contributions. After Guru Tegh Bahadur Sahib was executed at Chadani Chowk, Delhi in 1675, he along with thousands of men, including his 4 sons, attacked Mughal Army and gave the head of Guru Sahib to Bhai Jagjivan Singh and took the trunk of Guru Sahib to his village Raisan in Delhi, where he cremate the body of Guru Tegh Bahadur Ji. It is worthwhile to mention here that the age of Bhai Lakhisha Banjara was 95 when this incidence took place and he died after five years Guru Tegh Bahadur was executed.

Relations with Lakhishaha 
Lakhishaha banjara, an international trader who traveled around the world had family and business relationships with Bhai Makhan Shah Labana (1619-1674). He owned a fleet and traded through the Marines. Lakhi Shah, who was a Delhi-based trader, use to coordinate his business activities at Delhi.

References

Notes

Citations 

 Dr. Harjinder Singh Dilgeer, Sikh History-1.
 Hari Ram Gupta, History of the Sikhs.
 The Saint of Sadhaura, Pir Budhu Shah, Gurcharan Singh, V.S Suri
 Fozi kafir, Pir Budhu Shah.
 Khushwant Singh, A history of the Sikhs second edition.
 Muzaffar Alam, The Crisis of empire in Mughal North India, ISBM-019-807741-6
 The Mughal Empire and its Decline. An Interpretation of the Sources of Social Power,.
 Sikh History From Persian Source, 
 History of the Punjab Hill States (J. Hutchison and J.Ph Vogel)  and 81-206-0943-3

External links 
www.Lohgarh.com
https://www.sikhiwiki.org/index.php/Ignored_Sikh_Tribes;_Vanjaras,_Sikligars_and_Satnamis

Indian Sikhs
Sikh Empire